Conn O'Neill (Irish: Conn Ó Néill) was a lord of Clandeboye in medieval Ireland. He seized the lordship from his uncle Murtagh Roe O'Neill in 1468, though appears to have let him remain as chief of the Clandeboye O'Neill's. O'Neill reigned until his death in 1482, after which he was succeeded by his son Niall Mór O'Neill. O'Neill was married to Mary MacDonald.

References

Clandeboye
15th-century Irish people
O'Neill dynasty
1482 deaths